Daniel John Shea (January 29, 1947 – May 14, 1969) was a soldier in the US Army who posthumously received the Medal of Honor for his heroic actions and sacrifice of life during the Vietnam War for actions occurring in the Quang Tri Province on May 14, 1969.

Shea joined the Army from New Haven, Connecticut in 1967.

Namesake
The Shea-Magrath Sports Complex at Norwalk High School in Connecticut is partially named in his honor.  Shea Island off the coast of Norwalk is also named for him.

Medal of Honor citation
Private First Class Shea's official Medal of Honor citation reads:

For conspicuous gallantry and intrepidity in action at the risk of his life above and beyond the call of duty. Pfc. Shea, Headquarters and Headquarters Company, 3d Battalion, distinguished himself while serving as a medical aidman with Company C, 3d Battalion, during a combat patrol mission. As the lead platoon of the company was crossing a rice paddy, a large enemy force in ambush positions opened fire with mortars, grenades and automatic weapons. Under heavy crossfire from 3 sides, the platoon withdrew to a small island in the paddy to establish a defensive perimeter. Pfc. Shea, seeing that a number of his comrades had fallen in the initial hail of fire, dashed from the defensive position to assist the wounded. With complete disregard for his safety and braving the intense hostile fire sweeping the open rice paddy, Pfc. Shea made 4 trips to tend wounded soldiers and to carry them to the safety of the platoon position. Seeing a fifth wounded comrade directly in front of one of the enemy strong points, Pfc. Shea ran to his assistance. As he reached the wounded man, Pfc. Shea was grievously wounded. Disregarding his welfare, Pfc. Shea tended his wounded comrade and began to move him back to the safety of the defensive perimeter. As he neared the platoon position, Pfc. Shea was mortally wounded by a burst of enemy fire. By his heroic actions Pfc. Shea saved the lives of several of his fellow soldiers. Pfc. Shea's gallantry in action at the cost of his life were in keeping with the highest traditions of the military service and reflect great credit upon himself, his unit, and the U.S. Army.

See also
List of Medal of Honor recipients
List of Medal of Honor recipients for the Vietnam War

References

External links
 

1947 births
1969 deaths
American military personnel killed in the Vietnam War
Burials in Saint John's Cemetery (Norwalk, Connecticut)
People from Norwalk, Connecticut
United States Army Medal of Honor recipients
Vietnam War recipients of the Medal of Honor
Combat medics
Military personnel from Connecticut
United States Army soldiers
United States Army personnel of the Vietnam War